This is an overview of the men's swimming champions in individual events at the Olympics and the World Aquatics Championships. These tournaments are the only global long course (50 meter pool) swimming championships organized by world swimming federation FINA. This list gives an overview of the dominant swimmers throughout the history of swimming.

Currently, the Olympic program includes 14 individual events, and the World Championships program 17. These numbers were lower in the past, as shown in the table.

Asterisks (*) link to the event article. Use the sort function in the left-hand column to separate Olympics and World Championships.

Note: Only events that are presently contested have their own column in the above table. In some of the early Olympics, events were held that have been discontinued later on. Where possible, the champions in these events have been placed in a column corresponding to the nearest distance. In those cases the actual distance is added below the champion's name. Champions not included in the table are:
OG 1896. 100 m freestyle for sailors: Malokinis
OG 1900. 4000 m freestyle: Jarvis, 200 m obstacle: Lane, underwater: Devendeville
OG 1904. 440 yd breaststroke: Zacharias
OG 1912. 400 m breaststroke: Bathe
OG 1920. 400 m breaststroke: Malmrot

Title leaders 
The leaders in these events are listed below. All swimmers with at least three individual titles are included. Note that this list favors more recent swimmers due to the increasing number of events held, and the introduction and increasing frequency of the World Championships.

Asterisks (*) and bold denote active swimmers

See also 
List of individual gold medalists in swimming at the Olympics and World Aquatics Championships (women)
List of gold medalist relay teams in swimming at the Olympics and World Aquatics Championships
List of Olympic medalists in swimming (men)
List of World Aquatics Championships medalists in swimming (men)

References 
HistoFINA Swimming Medallists And Statistics At Olympic Games, January 31, 2015
HistoFINA Swimming Medallists And Statistics At FINA World Championships (50m), December 3, 2015
Sports-reference Olympic medalists

Gold medalists
Swimming statistics